Marius Høibråten (born 23 January 1995) is a Norwegian professional footballer who plays as a defender for J1 League club Urawa Red Diamonds.

Club career
Høibråten played for Fet IL in his early career, and joined Lillestrøm's youth section in 2009. On 1 May 2011 he made his senior debut in the 2011 Norwegian Football Cup. He made his debut in the Norwegian Premier League later that season.

In the latter half of the 2012 season he was loaned to Strømmen IF in the 1. Divisjon. In 2013, he returned to Lillestrøm, becoming more regular. However, on 23 August 2013, he signed a deal with Strømsgodset from 2014, leaving on Bosman. He made his debut for Strømsgodset on 30 March 2014 in the first league match of the season, and was a regular for the rest of the season.

In August 2018 Høibråten signed with Sandefjord on a two-year contract.

On 27 May 2020, he signed for Bodø/Glimt on a three-year contract. He proceeded to win two consecutive Eliteserien titles with the club, both in 2020 and 2021.

On 17 January 2023, Høibråten joined Japanese side Urawa Red Diamonds on a permanent deal. The club is a former club for his former teammate on Bodø/Glimt, Kasper Junker

Career statistics

Club
.

Honours
Bodø/Glimt
Eliteserien: 2020, 2021

References

External links

1995 births
Living people
People from Fet
Norwegian footballers
Association football defenders
Eliteserien players
J1 League players
Lillestrøm SK players
Strømmen IF players
Strømsgodset Toppfotball players
Sandefjord Fotball players
FK Bodø/Glimt players
Urawa Red Diamonds players
Sportspeople from Viken (county)
Norwegian expatriate footballers
Expatriate footballers in Japan
Norwegian expatriate sportspeople in Japan